Hamburg Dammtor is a railway station for long distance, regional and suburban trains on the Hamburg-Altona link line, located in Central Hamburg, Germany. In front is a bus station of the same name for public transport.

The railway station is one of four long-distance train stations in Hamburg. The other stations are Hamburg Hauptbahnhof, Hamburg-Altona and Hamburg-Harburg. Despite its size and importance, the station is classified as a railway stop (Haltepunkt) because it does not have any switches, a requirement for a station (Bahnhof) according to the regulations.

History
The name Dammtor originates from an old city gate located here until the end of the 19th century. The present railway station was opened on 7 July 1903.

Location
Hamburg Dammtor is close to the Wallring and the center of Hamburg, located in the quarter Rotherbaum of the Eimsbüttel borough. Nearby are also the University of Hamburg and the Congress Center Hamburg. As a result, the railway station signs have the addition Messe- und Kongressbahnhof (trade fair and congress station).

Gallery

Service 
The railway station has 4 elevated tracks, on two island platforms, one servicing the regional and long-distance trains, the other platform servicing the S-Bahn.

See also

Dammtor
Hamburg S-Bahn
Hamburger Verkehrsverbund

References

External links

DB station information 
Pictures of the Dammtor Station 

Dammtor
Dammtor
Hamburg Dammtor
Dammtor
Dammtor
Art Nouveau railway stations